Lady Dragon is a 1992 martial arts film starring actress and martial artist Cynthia Rothrock.

Plot 
Kathy Galagher is on mission of revenge against ruthless crime boss Ludwig Hauptman. Who ordered the death of her husband on the day of her wedding. She gets close to Hauptman only to be punished for her blind vengeance. Kathy is found by a martial arts master that teaches her a fighting style so she can exact revenge against her enemy.

Cast
 Cynthia Rothrock as Kathy Galagher
 Richard Norton as Ludwig Hauptman
 Robert Ginty as Gibson
 Bella Esperance as Susan
 Hengky Tornando as Allan
 Thomas Forcher as John Galagher
 Advent Bangun as Ringo
 H.I.M. Damsyik as Chin
 Henry Surentu as Sonny
 Syarief Friant as Marco
 Tanka as Hans
 Atek Darmo as Helmut
 Gino Makasutji as Andre
 Rony S.S. as Assassin
 Pitradjaya Burnama as Grandfather
 Diaz Tangkilisan as Boy
 Christine as Battered Girl
 Lydia Febriani as Mud Wrestler #1
 Ruby Rimba as Mud Wrestler #2
 Karsiman Gada as Bartender 
 Silva Sitha Dewi as Bikini Girl #1
 Linda as Bikini Girl #2
 Ita Tanjung as Bikini Girl #3
 Angela Veiny as Bikini Girl #4

Sequel
A sequel was released in 1993, with Rothrock returning to star with Billy Drago and Sam J. Jones with Worth as director.

References

External links
 

1992 martial arts films
1992 films
1990s action films
Police detective films
Films directed by David Worth (cinematographer)
1990s English-language films